The Adventures of Tintin is an animated television series co-produced, written, and animated by French animation studio Ellipse Programme and Canadian studio Nelvana Limited. The series is based on the comic book series of the same name by Belgian cartoonist Hergé. 39 half-hour episodes were produced over the course of three seasons, originally airing in France, Canada, and the United States between 1991 and 1992.

History 
The television series was directed by French director Stéphane Bernasconi, with Peter Hudecki as the Canadian unit director. Hudecki was the primary director but could not be credited due to co-production restrictions. It was produced by Ellipse (France) and Nelvana (Canada) on behalf of the Hergé Foundation. The series' writers included Toby Mullally, Eric Rondeaux, Martin Brossolet, Amelie Aubert, Dennise Fordham, and Alex Boon. It was the second television adaptation of Hergé's books, following the Belgian animation company Belvision's Hergé's Adventures of Tintin.

Production 
The series used traditional animation techniques and adheres closely to the original books, going so far as to transpose some frames from the original books directly to the screen. In the episodes "Destination Moon" and "Explorers on the Moon," 3D animation was used for the moon rocket—an unusual step in 1989. Each frame of the animation was then printed and recopied onto celluloid, hand painted in gouache, and then laid onto a painted background.

Artistically, the series chose a constant style, unlike in the books. In the books, the images had been drawn over the course of 47 years, during which Hergé's style developed considerably. However, later televised episodes, such as the "Moon" stories and "Tintin in America", clearly demonstrate the artists' development throughout the production of the television series. The series' original production language was English, but all visuals (road signs, posters, and settings) remained in French. Backgrounds in the show were more detailed and more cinematic shots were featured than in the original books.

Reception 
Along with fans, critics have praised the series for being "generally faithful" to the originals, with compositions having been actually taken directly from the panels in the original comic books.

Changes from the books 
Certain areas of the stories posed significant challenges for the producers who had to adapt features of the books to a younger and more modern audience. Nevertheless, this series was a much more faithful retelling of the books than the previous television adaptation. The frequent instances of violence, death, and the use of firearms were toned down or removed completely. The use of text as a major part of the plot, such as the use of newspaper articles or writing on the wall, was largely cut so these scenes would not have to be reanimated for every language in which Tintin was aired. The radio and television are both used more frequently in the TV series to make up for the omission.

Captain Haddock's penchant for whisky posed a problem for audience sensitivities. While the original books did not promote alcohol, they featured it heavily, with much humor based on drinking. However, in many countries where the producers hoped to sell the series, alcoholism was a sensitive issue. Therefore, international versions of the series had some alterations. "The Crab with the Golden Claws" is the only episode where Haddock's drinking is not significantly downplayed though it still played a pivotal role in several other episodes. In "Tintin in Tibet", Haddock is seen taking a sip from a flask of whisky to set up a scene in which Snowy, Tintin's dog, is tempted to lap up some spilled whisky and subsequently falls over a cliff. In "Tintin and the Picaros", Haddock is the only person taking wine with dinner, foreshadowing the use of Professor Calculus' tablets to "cure" the drunken Picaros. Haddock is also seen drinking in "The Calculus Affair" and "Explorers on the Moon", setting up the scene where he leaves the rocket in a drunken state. He does not hide the bottle in an astronomy book, as he does in the book, but keeps it in the refrigerator, making it less obvious for young viewers that it is alcohol.

Throughout the books, Snowy is frequently seen to be "talking". It is understood that his voice is only heard through the fourth wall, but this verbal commentary is completely absent in the television series. The only time it is maintained is in the ending of "Flight 714", when he "speaks" with Tintin's voice.

The character Jolyon Wagg only appeared in three stories ("The Calculus Affair," "The Seven Crystal Balls," and "Tintin and the Picaros") despite being in all but one installment of the book series.

List of changes
Smaller changes were made due to the necessity for simplification or audience requirements:

"The Calculus Affair"
 In the book, the Syldavians tried snatching Professor Calculus from the Bordurians but were removed from the TV show. This omission meant that Calculus' kidnapping happened later in the story.
 Jolyon Wagg appears only twice in this episode but was in many more scenes in the book. His family are not mentioned.
 After the blast in Topolino's house, Calculus is seen meeting Tintin and Haddock in the hospital. In the book, Calculus' next appearance after the explosion was being kidnapped and taken away in a motorboat.
"The Red Sea Sharks"
 This episode centres on smuggling Arab refugees to be killed in exchange for money while the book dealt with the modern enslavement of Africans, who were being sold.
 The Africans in the book volunteered to be stokers for Haddock's ship before being given more sophisticated work, while the Arab refugees in the show are immediately doing crew work. 
 Bab El Ehr is entirely removed from the storyline. Mull Pasha/Dr. Muller's role was expanded to fill this gap and he became the leader of the attempted coup d'état.
 When the Mosquitoes bomb the armoured cars, Muller is in one of the vehicles and communicates via walkie-talkie. In the original, Muller is inside the command headquarters and gives orders via telephone.
 Tintin and Haddock first meet Skut in "The Red Sea Sharks" episode, which aired after "Flight 714." Skut, however, appeared in "Flight 714." Amazon Prime switched the order of the episodes to remedy this. Another discontinuity was Rastapopooulos and Allan managing to escape the aliens without the audience sequentially understanding how.
"Tintin and the Picaros"
 While Tintin in the show is determined to rescue his friends and goes with Haddock and Calculus early in the adventure, Hergé's Tintin was less naïve. He refused to accompany them to rescue Castafiore and the detectives knowing it was a setup. He joins them later in the episode after his conscience gets the better of him.
 Tintin wears bell-bottoms in the books and wears plus fours in the show.
 Pablo's fate remains undetermined.
 The encounter with Ridgewell and the Arumbayas is removed along with the moment when Captain Haddock's first name is revealed.
"Tintin in America"
 This was the most altered episode in the series, amounting to an almost completely new story.
 The gangster element is given the main focus while the Native American storyline was completely removed. As such, Redskin City was renamed Red Dog City.
 In the book, Bobby Smiles was the head of a rival gang to Al Capone's while in the episode, he becomes Capone's henchman. Capone is unnamed.
 All criminals and hoodlums, including Capone, are captured at the end of the episode. In the books, Capone escapes. 
 The story "Tintin in the Congo" was not adapted to television, thus removing the scene where Capone talks to his gangsters about his criminal diamond smuggling campaign in the Belgian Congo, where Tintin and the colonial police arrest all members of the diamond smuggling scheme except him. In its place, Capone tells Bobby Smiles that he fears Tintin will eliminate their criminal operations. He orders Smiles to keep Tintin permanently off Capone's path.
 The episode reduces the roles of Smiles and the kidnapper by allowing Tintin to easily catch Smiles, the kidnapper, and Capone. Capone becomes the boss of both Smiles and the abductor. The storyline in the book is drawn out over a longer period, with many incidents occurring before Smiles, the kidnapper, and the kidnapper's accomplish, Maurice Oyle, are caught. 
 Maurice does not appear in the episode, while Capone is given a bigger role in place of the other mob bosses who appeared the book series.
 In the books, the kidnapper was nameless and his associate's name was Bugsie. In the television episode, the associate's name becomes the kidnapper's name and the accomplice becomes unnamed.
 Whereas the books show Tintin returning safely to Europe at the end, the episode has him receiving a phonecall about an unknown situation and leaving his hotel room to solve it. This was the end of the episode as well as the series.
"King Ottokar's Sceptre"
 King Muskar XII was renamed King Ottokar XII for the TV series.
 When the pilot throws Tintin in air, Professor Alembick's suitcase falls with him, and he got the clue in the photo that this Alembick is the twin of the real Alembick, whereas in the book the prime minister showed Tintin the photo at the end.
 Tintin accidentally crosses the border when he finds a Bourdurian airfield, while in the book, he is unintentionally chased over the border by border guards.
 Tintin gets the clue that the camera is a fake by looking outside Kropow Castle and finding some cannons. In the book, the clue comes from a toy store.
"The Secret of the Unicorn"
 Brutus the Great Dane is not shown.
 When Haddock and Tintin leave Tintin's apartment to see the painting of the Unicorn, the audience is shown someone watching them leave, then breaking into the flat. In the book, the robbery is only revealed when Tintin arrives home to find his model Unicorn missing.
 Nestor knocks Tintin unconscious in the episode whereas the hit on the head only produces a sore spot in the books.
 G. Bird's role in the television series is downplayed.
 In the books, Tintin is kidnapped and taken to Marlinspike Hall by two unknown "delivery men," while the Bird brothers themselves kidnap him in the episode.
 At the end of the episode, the Bird brothers share what happened at Marlinspike Hall and are later arrested at the Hall. In the book, G. Bird tells the story while Max escapes and is arrested at the national border. 
"Red Rackham's Treasure"
 Tintin has a smooth voyage in the shark submarine while in the book he is in peril when the submarine gets snarled with seaweed.
 When Professor Calculus first meets Tintin and Haddock, he does not mention that he is a little hearing impaired. This is only discussed later when he uses an ear trumpet in "Destination Moon."
 In the interest of time, the consequences of the press exposure are limited to meeting with Professor Calculus, meaning that Thompson and Thomson never visit the residence with Tintin and Haddock.
 Thompson and Thomson's holiday at a farm is removed.
 The treasure hunters do not return to the island to dig around the large wooden cross, confused about where the treasure could be buried.
 In the book, Haddock writes a message on the wall to tell Calculus that they are not interested in his invention. Rather, the Captain marks and X on the crate containing the submarine assembly. This allowed the animators to avoid having to make multiple written translations for each language in which the show was aired. 
"The Black Island"
 The gorilla Ranko crushes the rock Tintin throws at him. This show of strength does not appear in the book.
 The East down Fire Brigade's response to the burning of Müller's residence takes place at nightfall rather than during the daytime.
 The Counterfeit Ring based at the castle only consists of Müller, Ivan and Puschov, whereas in the book, there are an additional two unidentified members residing at the castle. 
 The struggle to find the fire station key was also omitted.
 In the book, Ivan the goon usually wears an automobile driver uniform and an unnamed Counterfeit Ring associate has back hair and mustache and wears a trench coat, bow-tie, and fedora. In the show, Ivan's original depiction is removed and he takes on the unnamed associate's appearance. Other minor characters are erased or have their appearances altered as well.
 Tintin and Snowy hitch a ride on a cargo train to reach the plane where the locomotive hijacked by Müller and Ivan was abandoned in the book. In the episode, they manage to catch up to it on foot.
 The side-plot of Thompson and Thomson having a fumbling ride on a biplane piloted by a ground mechanic, which escalates to them unintentionally appearing in an aerobatic aviation championship, is reduced to their predicament beginning and ending right at the Halchester Flying Club, thus removing the scene where Tintin watches the championship broadcast on television at Craig Dhui Castle.
 Puschov is never depicted using a whip to motivate Ranko into dispatching Tintin and Snowy as he was in the book.
 In the book, an unidentified aviator helps Tintin chase after Müller and Ivan on their way to Scotland when airborne, while the episode shows Tintin piloting the aircraft for advancement on his own. Other events from the book were either dramatized or toned down.
 Thompson and Thomson discover that Tintin is innocent much earlier in the episode than in the book.
"Cigars of the Pharaoh"
 Tintin's cruise is moved from the Mediterranean Sea to the Indian Ocean for the show.
 Scenes showing the crime boss writing orders hints that he is Rastapopoulos.
 The dream sequence when Tintin passes out in the tomb is made more frightening when the Pharaoh's emblem (colored red and slanted to look more like a "no" symbol) melts into smoke that appears to be blood and eventually transforms into a disfigured skull-like apparition. Immediately after, the smoke becomes a demonic cobra-like figure that slithers toward the camera (a 3D effect) and it appears to have “devoured” the sarcophagi containing Tintin, Snowy and Dr. Sarcophagus, which Allan eventually casts overboard.
 The gunrunner and Oliveira de Figueira's roles were much reduced, while the poet Zloty, Reverend Peacock, and Patrash Pasha are absent entirely.
 The asylum cell in the book has a bed while. In the TV show, the cell is padded and does not contain a bed.
 Dr. Finney is a member of the gang and writes a letter stating that Tintin was angry, while in the book, the fakir copied the doctor's handwriting for the letter.
 In the book, an unnamed Japanese person is a member of the gang. He is replaced by Allan Thompson, who Tintin recognizes, in the episode. He also recognizes Thomson. At this point in this book series, he had not met either of them yet. Following the chronology of the books, Tintin does not see Allan until "The Crab with the Golden Claws", but as the TV series episodes of "The Crab with the Golden Claws" aired before "Cigars of the Pharaoh", Tintin's recognition of Allan is credible when the episodes are viewed in that order. 
 Maharaja's son finds Tintin rather than him being recaptured by the asylum.
 In the book, Snowy attacks a holy cow while searching for Tintin and is captured by Hindus who want to sacrifice him. In the episode, Thompson and Thomson find him wandering the railroads and "arrest" him.
 Upon arriving in India in the book series, Tintin encounters an elephant who he cures of thirst, while the episode shows him finding Doctor Sarcophagus minutes after crashing in the jungle. The meeting with Mr. and Mrs. Snowball and Dr. Finney also occurs on the same day as his arrival rather than a few days after.
 The execution timeline was altered in the interest of time. In the book, it occurs on the same day that Tintin escapes Colonel Fuad.
"The Blue Lotus"
 While the book shows Chang's parents killed in the flood, the episodes shows the orphanage where Chang lives being washed away by the flood.
 Rajaijah Juice is renamed Raijaja Juice.
 Mitsuhirato's manservant is shown to be a double agent in the service of the Sons of the Dragon, and it is he who replaces the poison with a harmless substitute and delivers the real poison to his employers. In the book, this was done by another agent. 
 Gibbons is not shown at all, and Dawson's role is much reduced, as he is only shown as the police commissioner who calls in Thompson and Thomson, and does not appear to be in league with Mitsuhirato. This created a subsequent continuity error in "The Red Sea Sharks", as Tintin mentions having a "run-in" with Dawson despite not encountering him in this story.
 Tintin and Chang find Professor Fang Hsi-ying while searching for Rastapopoulos. In the book, Tintin finding him is only mentioned in the newspapers. 
 At the end of the story, Roberto Rastapopoulos tries to flee through the Blue Lotus club when the other villains are apprehended, but is himself caught by Thompson and Thomson. 
 The episode does not reveal Mitsuhirato's fate.
"The Broken Ear"
 Tintin disguises himself as a steward wearing a false moustache, glasses, and a black wig to spy on Ramon and Alonso. In the book, he disguises himself as an African waiter by using blackface.
 Tortilla is completely missing from the plot and is replaced by Walker's aide, Lopez, who is not mentioned to be mixed-race. 
 Further, Colonel-turned-Corporal Diaz is completely absent from the story, as are the numerous assassination attempts perpetrated by himself, R.W. Trickler, and Pablo.
 The subplot involving the rivalling petroleum companies is removed, and accordingly, Tintin never falls out of favour with General Alcazar, and Alonso and Ramon never find him in the Amazon. Instead, they disappear from the storyline after Tintin escapes from them in San Theodoros and do not appear again until the climax. 
 After being caught by Alonso and Ramon, Tintin is escorted to San Theodoros (off-screen) by Walker and the Arumbayas. In the book, Tintin walks back to Sanfacion, Nuevo Rico alone. 
 At the end of the episode, Tintin saves Ramon and Alonso. In the book, they drown and disappear into Hell, though this may be an imaginary scene or hallucination.
"Flight 714"
 Rastapopolous says that he was planning to shoot Dr Krollspell, whereas in the book he merely says "eliminate" and does not reveal plans for the other crew members or the Sondonesians. 
 It is also unknown if Tintin, Haddock, Calculus and the others actually went to Sydney after being interviewed by Colin Chattermore as they do not reveal what they will do after the interview. In addition, Colin does not interview Skut or Carreidas.
 The group is hypnotized after they get on the spaceship.
 In the end, the astroship drops Dr Krollspell off in India, where he was also dropped in the original French version of the story, and he is seen in television footage near the Taj Mahal. In the book, he is dropped off in Cairo off-screen.
"Tintin in Tibet"
 Tintin, Snowy and Captain Haddock go on vacation without Professor Calculus, who appears only in Haddock's daydream. 
 The stopover in the small village of Charabang during the quest to save Chang is omitted. 
 Captain Haddock is seen taking a sip from a flask of whisky in order to set up a scene in which Snowy laps up some spilt whisky, resulting in him falling off a cliff. 
 Tintin's nightmare and Chang calling him is seen; in the book, they are not. 
 Bianca Castafiore's cameo appearance is removed.
"The Shooting Star"
 The part of Philippulus the Prophet is significantly reduced. In the TV episode, he is only seen at the beginning of the story when Tintin reaches the observatory and when Tintin is having a nightmare.
 The Auroras maiden voyage ceremony that happens after Philippulus' departure from the ship is also removed. Auroras fuel stop in Akureyri, Iceland was likewise left out, resulting in Captain Chester being absent in this episode. 
 The Auroras crew spot the Peary through binoculars aboard the Aurora instead of by using a seaplane. 
 The appearance of the mutated spider on the meteorite that attempts to attack Tintin and Snowy during the climax of the story is much larger and made to look more frightening in the episode than in the book.
 Other more minor changes in the TV episode include the absence of the observatory's doorman, Thompson and Thomson's cameos, and Decimus Phostle's assistant suggesting the name for phostlite rather than Phostle ultimately naming it after himself. Tintin's input on how the meteorite could be claimed is also significantly shortened.
"Land of Black Gold"
 The car repairing parts featuring Thompson and Thomson were cut.
 Mohammed Ben Kalish Ezab was given a more sympathetic and caring role. He allows Tintin and Captain Haddock to take his car, whereas, in the book, he does not. 
 The role of Abdullah is downplayed and he does not seem to cry as much as he does in the book. 
 Also, Dr. Müller is does not use the alias Professor Smith, unlike the book where the Emir only discovers his identity at the end. 
 The half-destroyed Marlinspike Hall was shown in the episode, while in the book, it was shown in a photo taken by Professor Calculus. 
 Haddock only appears at the end of the television episode, whereas in the book he and Nestor made a cameo at the beginning.
"The Crab with the Golden Claws"
 The episode begins with an opening scene of a meeting between Bunji Kuraki and Herbert Dawes, which is only referred to in the book.
 Tintin later encounters an imprisoned Kuraki, which is not depicted in the book.
 Kuraki tells Tintin about Allan's plans; in the book, Tintin sees the drugs firsthand.
 Unlike in the book, Captain Haddock does not start a fire on the lifeboat that he, Tintin, and Snowy used to escape the Karaboudjan.
 The plane crash before the desert is also changed.
 In the book, Haddock is drunk and hits Tintin with a bottle before taking over rowing himself. In the adaption, the pilot attacks Tintin. The other pilot featured in the book does not appear.
 As in the 1950s adaptation, the ending is rewritten, replacing the fishing net with a rope.
"Destination Moon"
The episode starts with Tintin, Snowy and Haddock landing in Syldavia.
 Cuts are made solely for time, such as Tintin's misadventure with a pack of bears, Haddock's tantrums over the space trip, and a few other incidents like a false fire alarm. 
 The episode's ending is taken from the beginning of the book's sequel, "Explorers on the Moon", where Tintin, Captain Haddock, Professor Calculus, and Wolff awaken after take-off. The book ends in a cliffhanger with the radio crew calling them and receiving no response.
"Explorers on the Moon"
 Since the opening to this story served as the ending in "Destination Moon", the episode begins with the crew in the control cabin.
 Tintin's attempt to rescue Haddock from his impromptu spacewalk around the asteroid Adonis is made more dramatic and heightened than in the book, with both of them getting pulled into orbit and Tintin having to use a grappling iron to return them to the rocket. 
 Snowy's rescue from the cave is omitted. 
 The role of the spymaster behind Jorgen is reduced. 
 Captain Haddock is seen drinking alcohol, setting up the scene in which he leaves the rocket drunk. He does not hide the bottle in an astronomy book, as he did in the book, but keeps the bottle in the refrigerator.
"The Seven Crystal Balls"
 The episode begins with the Seven Explorers of the Sanders-Hardiman Expedition finding the Mummy of Rascar Capac. This is only referred to in the book.
 Following the chronology of the books, Jolyon Wagg does not appear until "The Calculus Affair". In the TV series, episodes of "The Calculus Affair" aired before "The Seven Crystal Balls". When the episodes are viewed in that order, Jolyon's appearance is credible.
 The character of Mrs. Clarkson is expanded slightly - in the comic she appears only once in the theater being informed of her husband's illness. In the episode she is in an added scene in the hospital crying over her comatose husband.
"Prisoners of the Sun"
 Some changes are made solely for time, such as Tintin and Haddock's execution being reduced to one day from eighteen, and some of the action in the jungle being cut or toned down.
"The Castafiore Emerald"
 When Castafiore arrives, she still gifts Captain Haddock with the parrot Iago, but the parrot's part is significantly downplayed. As such, the bird does not manage to pick up much of Haddock’s verbal slang.
 In the book, Iago is allowed to fly free at the end, but he is completely absent in Part 2 of the show.
 Castafiore trips over the broken stair, while in the book she is the only character not to.
 Miarka is much friendlier towards Tintin and Haddock and does not bite the Captain. Similarly, Miarka's uncle is less hostile to Tintin and Haddock and does not try to throw a rock at Tintin as in the book. He also does not think Marlinspike Hall's inhabitants deeply hate him and other gypsies.
 The scene when Thomson and Thompson confront the gypsies is shown.

Stories not adapted 
Three of the Tintin books were not included in the animated series:
 Tintin in the Land of the Soviets due to its unflattering portrayal of Russians
 Tintin in the Congo due to issues around animal abuse and its racist colonial attitude towards the native Congolese
 Tintin and Alph-Art due to being incomplete

Hergé's cameo appearances 
Hergé, the creator of Tintin, makes cameo appearances reminiscent of Stan Lee and Alfred Hitchcock in each episode of the cartoon series, as he often did in the original books. Most of the time, he is just a passing figure in the street, such as when he is a passerby checking his watch in "The Blue Lotus", a reporter in "The Broken Ear", or a technician in "Explorers on the Moon". His letterbox can be seen next to Tintin in "The Crab with the Golden Claws". He also appeared as a gangster in "Tintin in America" and an asylum inmate at the in "Cigars of the Pharaoh", along with his fellow artist and collaborator Edgar P. Jacobs.

Music 
The underscore music and the main title theme for the series were written by Ray Parker and Tom Szczesniak, and recorded by engineer James Morgan. Excerpts from the score were released by Lé Studio Ellipse on CD and cassette in conjunction with Universal Music Group on the StudioCanal label. It is now out of print in both formats.

Releases

Online platforms 
Since its remastering into 1080p widescreen high definition, Amazon Prime and Netflix have both made the series available in certain territories.

Home video

Voice artists

English (The Adventures of Tintin) 
 Colin O'Meara as Tintin, Lieutenant Kavitch, additional voices
 Susan Roman as Snowy
 David Fox as Captain Haddock, Sir Francis Haddock
 Wayne Robson as Professor Cuthbert Calculus
 Dan Hennessey as Thomson
 John Stocker as Thompson, additional voices
 Maureen Forrester as Bianca Castafiore
 Vernon Chapman as Nestor
 Denis Akiyama as Mitsuhirato, Bunji Kuraki, Tharkey
 Harvey Atkin as Emir Mohammed Ben Kalish Ezab
 Ho Chow as Mr. Li, Cheng Li-Kin
 Keith Knight as Gustav Bird, additional voices
 Julie Lemieux as Chang Chong-Chen
 Peter Meech as Radio Announcer
 Chris Wiggins as Wang Chen-Yee
 Peter Wildman as Hector and Alfred Alembick

Additional voices were provided by:
 Yank Azman
 Barbara Budd
 Robert Cait
 Graeme Campbell
 Liz Dufresne
 Paul Haddad
 Graham Haley
 Keith Hampshire
 David Huband
 Marvin Ishmael
 Tom Kneebone
 Michael Lamport
 Ray Landry
 Neil Munro
 Frank Perry
 Frank Proctor
 Mario Romano
 Ron Rubin
 August Schellenberg

French (Les Aventures de Tintin) 
 Thierry Wermuth as Tintin
 Susan Roman as Milou
 Christian Pelissier as Capitaine Haddock
 Henri Labussiere as Professeur Tryphon Tournesol
 Yves Barsacq as Dupont, Wronzoff, Ivan Ivanovitch Sakharine, Mohammed Ben Kalish Ezab, Ridgewell, Wang Jen-Ghié, le colonel Alvarez, le professeur Philémon Siclone, le docteur Rotule, le Grand Précieux, Calys, Kronick, Gino the photographer, additional voices
 Jean-Pierre Moulin as Dupond, le maharadjah de Rawhajpoutalah, Muskar XII, Chaubet, Boris, Sanders, Philippulus le prophète, Manolo, le photographe japonais, Bohlwinkel, Miller, Walther (voix 1), Jean-Loup de la Batellerie,  additional voices
 Michel Ruhl as Nestor, le professeur Hornet, Walther (voix 2),  additional voices
 Marie Vincent as Bianca Castafiore
 Michel Gudin as le général Alcazar
 Serge Sauvion as Rastapopoulos
 Marc Moro as Allan Thompson, Maxime Loiseau, le colonel Jorgen, le colonel Sponsz, Ranko, Pedro, Al Capone, Dawson, Ramon Bada, Bab El Ehr, Hippolyte Calys, Hippolyte Bergamotte, Chiquito, Huascar, Barnabé, Pablo, Hans Boehm, Paolo Colombani, Gino the pilot, Yamato, le général Haranochi, Ivan, Zlop, Himmerszeck, Ragdalam, Isidore Boullu, Matéo, additional voices
 Michel Tureau as Müller, Szut, Bobby Smiles, Rackham le Rouge, Mitsuhirato, Baxter, Igor Wagner, Gustave Loiseau, Aristide Filoselle, Nestor Halambique, Alfred Halambique, Marc Charlet, Tharkey, Kavitch, le docteur Krollspell, Tom, lieutenant Delcourt, Walter Rizotto, le fakir, le docteur Finney, Alfredo Topolino, Walter, additional voices
 Henri Lambert as Frank Wolff, le Grand Inca, Sirov, le général Tapioca, Alonzo Perez, le professeur Cantonneau, Mac O'Connor, Foudre Bénie, Spalding, Stephan, Kurt, Mik Ezdanitoff, Herbert Dawes, additional voices
 David Lesser as Tchang Tchong-Jen
 Serge Lhorca as Oliveira da Figueira
 Sophie Arthuys as Abdallah, Irma, le fils du maharadjah de Rawhajpoutalah
 Patricia Legrand as Zorrino, Lobsang
 Jean-Pierre Leroux as Bunji Kuraki, Omar Ben Salaad
 Georges Berthomieu as Séraphin Lampion
 William Coryn as Didi
 Daniel Brémont as Laszlo Carreidas

Episodes 
Running order of the TV series as per original broadcast schedule.

Season 1

Season 2

Season 3

See also 

 List of French animated television series
 The Adventures of Tintin: The Secret of the Unicorn
 Blake and Mortimer

References

External links 
 Tintin at Citel Video
 
 Guide to screen adaptions of "Tintin" at tintinologist.org

1990s Canadian animated television series
1991 Canadian television series debuts
1992 Canadian television series endings
1990s French animated television series
1991 French television series debuts
1992 French television series endings
Cultural depictions of cartoonists
Belgian children's animated action television series
Belgian children's animated adventure television series
Belgian children's animated comedy television series
Belgian children's animated drama television series
Belgian children's animated mystery television series
Canadian children's animated action television series
Canadian children's animated adventure television series
Canadian children's animated comedy television series
Canadian children's animated drama television series
Canadian children's animated mystery television series
Canadian television shows based on children's books
French children's animated action television series
French children's animated adventure television series
French children's animated comedy television series
French children's animated drama television series
French children's animated mystery television series
French television shows based on children's books
English-language television shows
Global Television Network original programming
1990s Canadian comedy-drama television series
Television shows based on comic strips
Television series based on Belgian comics
Television series by Nelvana
Tintin
France Télévisions children's television series
Television series about the Moon
Television shows set in Morocco
Television shows set in Belgium
Television shows set in Egypt
Television shows set in India
Television shows set in China
Television shows set in Scotland
Television shows set in Switzerland
Television shows set in Iceland
Television shows set in Mexico
Television shows set in South America
Television shows set in Nepal
Television series set in the Middle East
Television shows set in Indonesia
Television shows set in the United States